Past and present learned societies in the territory that is now Italy include:

 Contents: See also  References  Bibliography

See also

 List of academies of fine art in Italy
 List of learned societies

References

Further reading 
  (1830). Catalogo: Delle altre accademie d'Italia che fiorirono dal secolo XIII fino al presente (in Italian). In: Edizione completa degli scritti di agricoltura arti e commercio, volume IX, pages 409–441. Udine: Matteuzzi.
 Nello Tarchiani, Giuseppe Gabrieli, Adelmo Damerini (1929). Accademia (in Italian). Enciclopedia Italiana. Roma: Istituto dell'Enciclopedia Italiana. 
 

Italy education-related lists
Lists of organisations based in Italy